Little Green Island is directly south of Green Island within the Chugach National Forest north of Montague Island in Prince William Sound, Alaska.

Islands of Alaska
Islands of Chugach Census Area, Alaska
Islands of Unorganized Borough, Alaska